Glischrocaryon (Common name: Golden pennants) is a genus of flowering plants in the family Haloragaceae, endemic to Australia. Species occur in New South Wales, Victoria, South Australia and Western Australia include:
Glischrocaryon angustifolium (Nees) M.L. Moody & Les 
Glischrocaryon aureum (Lindl.) Orchard  Common Popflower
Glischrocaryon behrii  (Schltdl.) Orchard   Golden Pennants
Glischrocaryon flavescens  (J.Drumm.) Orchard 
Glischrocaryon roei  Endl.

References

Bibliography 

 
 

 

Saxifragales genera
Haloragaceae
Saxifragales of Australia